John Freeman may refer to:

Politicians
John Freeman (Australian politician) (1894–1970), Australian politician
John Freeman (British politician) (1915–2014), British politician, broadcaster and television presenter
John Freeman (Wyoming politician) (born 1954), member of the Wyoming House of Representatives
John Bailey Freeman (1835–1890), Canadian politician
John D. Freeman (1817–1886), U.S. Representative from Mississippi

Sportspeople
John Freeman (cricketer) (1883–1958), English cricketer
John Freeman (baseball) (1901–1958), American baseball player
John Freeman (footballer) (born 2001), English footballer
John Freeman (rugby) (1934–2017), Welsh rugby union and professional rugby league footballer
John Childe-Freeman (born 1935), known as John Freeman, cricketer for Queensland
John Ripley Freeman (1855–1932), American civil engineer
Buck Freeman (John Frank Freeman, 1871–1949), American baseball player

Writers and editors
John Freeman (poet) (1880–1929), English poet
 John Freeman (1903–1950), pseudonymous author of essay "Can Socialists Be Happy?", now attributed to George Orwell  
John Freeman (editor) (born 1960), British writer and editor
John Freeman (author) (born 1974), American literary critic and former editor of Granta

Others
John Freeman (VC) (1832–1913), British Army soldier, Victoria Cross recipient
John Freeman (animator) (1916–2010), American character animator for Disney, Marvel Studios and others
John M. Freeman (1933–2014), American pediatric neurologist
John Freeman (trade unionist) (1933–2011), trade union leader from Northern Ireland
John Freeman (diplomat) (born 1951), British diplomat, Governor of Turks and Caicos Islands
John Craig Freeman (born 1959), artist and professor of new media
John Freeman, the fictional protagonist of the web series Half-Life: Full Life Consequences

See also
Jack Freeman (disambiguation)
Jonathan Freeman (disambiguation)
John Freeman-Mitford (disambiguation)
Jonny Freeman, British actor and comedian